Crowley is a city in, and the parish seat of, Acadia Parish in the U.S. state of Louisiana. At the 2020 United States census, Crowley had a population of 11,710. Crowley is the principal city of the Crowley micropolitan statistical area, which includes all of Acadia Parish. It is also part of the larger Lafayette–Acadiana combined statistical area.

History

Crowley was founded in 1886 by C.C. Duson and W.W. Duson. Incorporated in 1887, W.W. Duson, General Manager of Southwest Louisiana Land Company, plotted and developed Crowley. W.W. Duson's daughter, Maime Duson, married Percy Lee Lawrence, who founded the First National Bank of Crowley. The 7-story building was once the tallest building between Houston and New Orleans. They lived with their three children, P.L. Jr., Pattee, and Jack at 219 East 2nd Street. The house was burned down in a fire a few years later.

The town was named after Pat Crowley, an Irish railroad owner who brought the railroad depot to W.W. Duson's land.  Descendants of founder W.W. Duson continue to live in Crowley.

Geography

Louisiana Highway 13 passes through the city with Kaplan, which is located in Vermilion Parish, being located 19 miles southeast and Eunice, located in both Acadia and St. Landry parishes, is located 20 miles north. The city of Rayne is located 9 miles east of Crowley via U.S. Highway 90 and I-10. The city of Jennings is located 17 miles west via U.S. Highway 90 and I-10.

Climate

Demographics

At the 2020 United States census, there were 11,710 people, 4,807 households, and 2,934 families residing in the city. At the 2019 American Community Survey, there were 4,807 households.

In 2019, the racial and ethnic makeup of the city was 58.5% non-Hispanic or Latino white, 34.8% Black or African American, <0.0% Asian, 0.4% some other race, 1.9% two or more races, and 4.4% Hispanic and Latin American of any race. At the 2000 U.S. census, the racial and ethic makeup was 67.83% White American, 30.98% Black or African American, 0.15% American Indian and Alaska Native, 0.29% Asian, 0.01% Native Hawaiian or other Pacific Islander, 0.23% from other races, and 0.51% from two or more races. Hispanics and Latin Americans were 1.10% of the population.

There were 4,807 households, and 33.5% were married couples living together, 18.5% male households with no female present, and 41.8% female households with no male present. The average family size was 3.34.

In the city, the population was spread out, with 5.4% aged 5 and under, 72.4% aged 18 and older, and 17.2% aged 65 and older. The median age was 37.7 years, up from 35 years at the 2000 United States census.

The median income for a household in the city was $26,972. Family households had a median income of $31,168, married couples had a median income of $50,066, and non-family households had a median income of $19,138. An estimated 37.1% of the population lived at or below the poverty line.

Arts and culture
Crowley is noted for its annual International Rice Festival. Crowley has the nickname of "Rice Capital of the World", because at one time it was a major center for rice harvesting and milling. Today, Crowley still has a number of rice mills and rice is the main crop of many local farmers.

Education
The Crowley High School "Fighting Gents" were State Division 3A champions in the 1989 football season and had an 8-2 regular season.

Crowley is also the home of Notre Dame High School. Notre Dame is an Acadia Parish-wide Catholic high school whose football program has won six state championships and numerous District Champion titles, in addition to numerous state championships in other sports, such as men's baseball, women's softball, men's tennis, men's track & field, and women's volleyball.

Notable people
John Breaux, member of United States Senate and House of Representatives
Jack Brooks, member of the United States House of Representatives from Texas from 1953 to 1995 and Chairman of the House Judiciary Committee from 1989 to 1995, born in Crowley
Pimp C, deceased record producer and rapper 
Tommy Casanova, Three-time all American LSU football 1969,70,71.  A four-time All-Pro Cincinnati Bengals defensive back/punt returner from 1972 to 1977, former Louisiana State Senator. 
Bill Cleveland, Crowley real estate developer and member of both houses of Louisiana state legislature from 1944 to 1964; defeated for third term in state Senate in 1964 by Edwin Edwards
Denis Reggie, regarded as the world's preeminent wedding photographer and pioneer of the quiet documentary style known as wedding photojournalism.
Edwin Edwards, former governor of Louisiana, U.S. representative, and state senator
Jim Gueno, Green Bay Packers linebacker from 1976 to 1980
Winsor Harmon, soap opera actor born on the day of the John F. Kennedy assassination
Eric Hetzel, former pitcher for the Boston Red Sox
Chris John, former Democratic member of the United States House of Representatives and the Louisiana House of Representatives
Edward "Kidd" Jordan, jazz saxophonist, composer, and educator
Victoria Reggie Kennedy, native of Crowley, second wife of the late Senator Edward M. Kennedy
Rose Wilder Lane, author 
J. D. "Jay" Miller, composer, musician, recording engineer
Phil Phillips, American singer and songwriter
Orlando Thomas, Minnesota Vikings defensive back from 1995 to 2001
Clifford Joseph Trahan, recorded white supremacist songs under the name Johnny Rebel
Godfrey Zaunbrecher, American football player

References

External links

 City of Crowley
Crowley Chamber of Commerce
International Rice Festival, held every third weekend in October
 Acadia Parish Library

 
Acadiana
Cities in Louisiana
Cities
Cities in Acadia Parish, Louisiana
Populated places established in 1887
1887 establishments in Louisiana
Cities in Lafayette, Louisiana metropolitan area